Devs is an American science fiction thriller television miniseries created, written, and directed by Alex Garland. It premiered on March 5, 2020, on FX on Hulu.

Lily Chan (Sonoya Mizuno) is a software engineer for Amaya, a quantum computing company run by Forest (Nick Offerman). Lily soon becomes embroiled in the mysterious death of her boyfriend, who died on the first day of his new job at Devs. The series explores themes related to free will and determinism, as well as Silicon Valley. It received generally positive reviews, with critics praising its imagination, cinematography, acting, and soundtrack.

Cast and characters

Main
 Sonoya Mizuno as Lily Chan, a software engineer at Amaya
 Nick Offerman as Forest, CEO of Amaya
 Jin Ha as Jamie, a cybersecurity specialist and Lily's ex-boyfriend
 Zach Grenier as Kenton, head of security at Amaya
 Stephen McKinley Henderson as Stewart, a member of the Devs team at Amaya
 Cailee Spaeny as Lyndon, a member of the Devs team specializing in work on sound waves.
 Karl Glusman as Sergei Pavlov, Lily's boyfriend and co-worker at Amaya
 Alison Pill as Katie, the chief designer of the Devs system

Recurring
 Linnea Berthelsen as Jen, Lily's coworker and good friend
 Aimee Mullins as Anya, Lily's coworker
 Jefferson Hall as Pete, a homeless man who sleeps outside Lily's apartment
 Janet Mock as Senator Laine
 Georgia King as Lianne, Forest's wife
 Amaya Mizuno-André as Amaya, Forest's daughter

Guest
 Brian d'Arcy James as Anton
 David Tse as Lily's father
 Liz Carr as a university lecturer
 Corey Johnson as a psychiatrist

Episodes

Production

Development
 
On March 13, 2018, it was announced that FX had given the production a pilot order. The pilot was written by Alex Garland, who also directed and executive produced the episode. On July 23, 2018, Rob Hardy mentioned in an interview that he would serve as the cinematographer for the series.

On August 3, 2018, it was announced during the Television Critics Association's annual summer press tour that FX had decided to bypass the pilot process and instead were giving the production a straight-to-series order consisting of eight episodes. Additional executive producers include Andrew Macdonald, Allon Reich, Eli Bush, and Scott Rudin.

Garland appeared at the New York Comic Con and explained his reasoning behind the creation of the series: "I read more about science than anything else, and it started with two things. One was getting my head around this principle of determinism, which basically says that everything that happens in the world is based on cause and effect...That has all sorts of implications for us. One is that it takes away free will, but the other is that if you are at a computer powerful enough, you could use determinism to predict the future and understand the past. If you unravel everything about you, about the specifics of you why you prefer a cup of coffee to tea...then five seconds before you said you'd like to have a cup of coffee one would be able to predict you'd ask for it." In November 2019, it was announced the show would premiere on Hulu instead of FX, as part of "FX on Hulu". On January 9, 2020, it was announced that the series would premiere on March 5, 2020.

Casting
Alongside the series order announcement, it was confirmed that Sonoya Mizuno, Nick Offerman, Jin Ha, Zach Grenier, Stephen McKinley Henderson, Cailee Spaeny, and Alison Pill had been cast in the series' main roles. Amaya Mizuno-André, who plays Forest's daughter Amaya, is Sonoya Mizuno's niece.

Filming
Filming on the series had begun by August 2018, with scenes shot at UC Santa Cruz.

Release
The first teaser for the series was released October 5, 2019. The first two episodes of the series were released on March 5, 2020, with the rest debuting weekly on Hulu under the label "FX on Hulu". In India, the series premiered on Hotstar on March 6, 2020. The series premiered on BBC Two in the UK on April 15, 2020, with the whole series available on iPlayer at the same time. On September 23, 2020, Fox Greece picked up the series and began airing it on September 28, 2020.

Reception

Audience viewership 
According to Whip Media's TV Time, Devs was the second most anticipated new television series of March 2020, and the tenth rising show, based on the week-over-week growth in episodes watched for a specific program, during the week of March 15, 2020. In January 2021, it was reported that Devs was one of FX on Hulu’s most-watched series to date, surpassed by A Teacher.

Critical response 
The series has an 82% rating with an average score of 7.7 out of 10 based on 90 reviews on Rotten Tomatoes. The site's critical consensus reads: "A hauntingly beautiful meditation on humanity, Devs slow unfurling may test some viewers' patience, but fans of Alex Garland's singular talents will find much to chew on." On Metacritic, it has a score of 71 out of 100 based on 32 reviews, indicating "generally favorable reviews."

Brian Tallerico of RogerEbert.com found Devs to be a highly philosophical and intellectual sci-fi and called it "stunningly ambitious," stated, "It's ultimately an unforgettable and rewarding experience." Tallerico praised Garland's work and concluded by writing, "one of the best new shows in a long time." Brian Lowry of CNN called the series audacious, summarizing that it is "a mind-blowing concept that doesn't entirely come together at the close, but which remains unsettling and provocative throughout." Alan Sepinwall of Rolling Stone rated the series 4 out of 5 stars, praised the performances of the actors, and complimented writing and the score, saying, "Alex Garland's new sci-fi series is a confounding and mesmerizing trip into a scary near-future." Martin Brown of Common Sense Media rated the series 3 out of 5 stars, praised the depiction of positive messages and role models, writing, "Devs poses ethical and moral questions about the nature of technology. Characters don't always act for the greater good, but some are driven by a sense of what is right," and complimented the diversity of the cast members.

In a more mixed review from The New York Times, James Poniewozik wrote that "It showcases what Garland does well—ideas and atmosphere—while amplifying his weaknesses in character and plot. As the techies say, it scales—for better and for worse." In a more negative review, Sophie Gilbert of The Atlantic wrote that "Devs is only the latest in a series of puzzle-box shows more preoccupied with their own cleverness and their labyrinthine twists than with the burden of watchability."

The New York Times interviewed theoretical physicist Sean Carroll about sweeping statements about humanity and determinism made by the creators of Devs and Westworld. When asked which show he preferred, Carroll responded, "I was very impressed with how [Devs creators] were doing something very, very different. I thought it was a very well done show. It was slow and contemplative, but that's a perfectly good change of pace from what we ordinarily see in action movies".

Accolades

See also
 Laplace's demon

References

External links
  on Hulu
  on FX
 
 

2020 American television series debuts
2020 American television series endings
2020s American drama television miniseries
2020s American science fiction television series
Techno-thrillers
English-language television shows
FX on Hulu original programming
Television series about computing
Television shows set in San Francisco
Works by Alex Garland